Phasmid may refer to:
 Phasmid (nematode anatomy), a sensory structure in nematodes
 Phasmatodea, the order of insects which contains stick insects, walking sticks, ghost insects and leaf insects
 Phagemid, a vector used in gene cloning

Animal common name disambiguation pages